Archana IAS is a 1991 Indian Tamil language political drama film directed by A. Jagannathan. The film stars Sithara, R. Sarathkumar and Siva, with Janagaraj, Vijayakumar, Srividya, Thalapathy Dinesh, Senthil and Delhi Ganesh playing supporting roles. It was released on 5 July 1991.

Plot

Archana is the daughter of the widow Bhavani, who brought up Archana alone and wanted her daughter to become an IAS officer. Her mother didn't hesitate to physically torture Archana if she disobeyed her rules. Archana was a clever college student, and she won many cups during college. She was friendly with the orphan Kumar and Mala, who was the sister of the college professor Santhosh Kumar. One day, Dinesh killed Mala in front of her brother Santhosh Kumar. The police then arrested Dinesh and the innocent Santhosh Kumar. The following day, Dinesh was released by the police using his father's power.

After that, Archana becomes an IAS Officer, and Siva becomes a police officer. Her mother, Bhavani finally reveals the reason behind her wish to see Archana as an IAS officer. In the past, Bhavani was cheated by Anandamurthy, and he forced her to abort the baby, but she refused and ran away. Archana is now determined to punish her father, Anandamurthy, who is now a powerful and corrupt minister.

Cast

Sithara as Archana IAS, Social Welfare Secretary
R. Sarathkumar as Santhosh Kumar
Siva as Inspector Kumar
Janagaraj as Perumalswamy
Vijayakumar as Anandamurthy
Srividya as Bhavani
Thalapathy Dinesh as Dinesh
Senthil
Delhi Ganesh as Dinesh's father
Kumarimuthu
Oru Viral Krishna Rao
Sri Lakshmi as Lakshmi
Yamini as Mala
M. R. Krishnamurthy as College principal
Ennatha Kannaiya
Theni Kunjarammal
Typist Gopu as Sabesan
Gundu Kalyanam
Thideer Kannaiah

Soundtrack
The film score and the soundtrack were composed by S. A. Rajkumar. The soundtrack, released in 1991, features 5 tracks with lyrics written by Vaali, Muthulingam, Na. Kamarasan and S. A. Rajkumar.

References

External links
 

1991 films
1990s Tamil-language films
Indian political drama films
Indian feminist films
Films about women in India
Indian action drama films
Films scored by S. A. Rajkumar
1990s action drama films
1990s political drama films
Political action films
1991 drama films
1990s feminist films